The Wings of Change Taifun (Typhoon) is an Austrian single-place paraglider that was designed by Markus Gründhammer and produced by Wings of Change of Fulpmes. It is now out of production.

Design and development
The Taifun was designed as an intermediate glider. The models are each named for their relative size.

Variants
Taifun S
Small-sized model for lighter pilots. The glider model is Deutscher Hängegleiterverband e.V. (DHV) LTF/EN B certified.
Taifun M
Mid-sized model for medium-weight pilots. The glider model is DHV LTF/EN B certified.
Taifun L
Large-sized model for heavier pilots. The glider model is DHV LTF/EN B certified.

Specifications (Taifun M)

References

External links

Taifun
Paragliders